The 37th CARIFTA Games was held in the Bird Rock Athletic Stadium in Basseterre, Saint Kitts and Nevis, on March 21–24, 2008.   IAAF president Lamine Diack was visiting the games emphasizing the event's importance and high value.  Detailed
reports on the results were given.

Participation (unofficial)

Detailed result lists can be found on the St. Kitts-Nevis Amateur Athletic
Association website, and on the "World Junior Athletics History"
website. An unofficial count yields the number of about 488
athletes (278 junior (under-20) and 210 youth (under-17)) from about 22
countries:
Anguilla (11), Antigua and Barbuda (10), Aruba (4), Bahamas (55), Barbados
(39), Bermuda (24), British Virgin Islands (10), Cayman Islands (12), Dominica
(4), Grenada (19), Guadeloupe (28), Guyana (3), Jamaica (68), Martinique (40),
Netherlands Antilles (6), Saint Kitts and Nevis (55), Saint Lucia (11), Saint
Vincent and the Grenadines (6), Suriname (1), Trinidad and Tobago (63), Turks
and Caicos Islands (9), US Virgin Islands (10).

Records

A total of 9 new games records were set.

In the boys' U-20 category, Jamaican long distance runner Kemoy Campbell
set the new 5000m record to 14:46.51, while his compatriot
K'don Samuels improved the 21-year-old mark of 4.26m in pole vault to 4.60m.

In the girls' U-20 category, four new games records were set: for 800 metres,
by Natoya Goule of Jamaica to 2:05.90, for 100 metres
hurdles record by Kierre Beckles of Barbados to 13.43s (0.4 m/s), for the Pentathlon by Salcia Slack of Jamaica to 3935 points, and by the 4 x 100 metres relay team from the Bahamas to 44.36s.

Finally, there were three more games records in the boys' U-17 category: by
Bahamians Aaron Wilmore who finished the 100 m hurdles in 12.88s (0.6 m/s), and compatriot Nejmi Burnside with 52.81s in the
400 m hurdles. Dillon Simon of Dominica reached a
width of 16.63m to establish a new U-17 shot put record.

Austin Sealy Award

The Austin Sealy Trophy for the
most outstanding athlete of the games was awarded to Kierre Beckles of
Barbados.  She won the gold medals in the 100m hurdles
competition in the
junior (U-20) category setting the new games record to 13.43s,
and a bronze medal in the 4 × 100 m relay.

Medal summary

Complete results can be found on the St. Kitts-Nevis Amateur Athletic
Association website, and on the "World Junior Athletics History"
website.

Boys under 20 (Junior)

: Open event for both junior and youth athletes.

Girls under 20 (Junior)

: Open event for both junior and youth athletes.

Boys under 17 (Youth)

Girls under 17 (Youth)

Medal table

The medal count has been published.

References

External links
World Junior Athletics History

CARIFTA Games
2008 in Saint Kitts and Nevis
CARIFTA
Sport in Saint Kitts and Nevis
2008 in Caribbean sport
International sports competitions hosted by Saint Kitts and Nevis
Athletics competitions in Saint Kitts and Nevis